Kishwaukee River State Fish and Wildlife Area is an Illinois state park on  in DeKalb County, Illinois, United States.

History
The land for the Kishwaukee River State Fish and Wildlife Area was acquired by the state of Illinois in 2002. That year, the state purchased  of land along the South Branch Kishwaukee River in DeKalb County. The state purchase was facilitated by US$2.68 million from the Illinois Open Land Trust.

Description
Kishwaukee River State Fish and Wildlife Area is located along the south bank of the South Branch Kishwaukee River just west of Kirkland, in DeKalb County, Illinois. The state property is located adjacent to the DeKalb County Forest Preserve's MacQueen Forest Preserve. The county eventually completed the purchase of the land on the north bank, across from the Fish and Wildlife Area, and designated it the Potawatomi Woods Forest Preserve. Between state and local land acquisitions more than  abutting  of the river are publicly owned.

See also
Kishwaukee River
North Branch Kishwaukee River

References
Specific

General

State parks of Illinois
Protected areas of DeKalb County, Illinois
Kishwaukee River
Protected areas established in 2002
2002 establishments in Illinois